The Roman Catholic Church in Panama comprises one ecclesiastical province each headed by an archbishop. The province is in turn subdivided into 5 dioceses, 1 territorial prelature and 1 archdiocese each headed by a bishop or an archbishop.

List of Dioceses

Ecclesiastical province of Panamá 
 Archdiocese of Panamá
 Diocese of Chitré
 Diocese of Colón-Kuna Yala
 Diocese of David
 Diocese of Penonomé
 Diocese of Santiago de Veraguas
 Prelature of Bocas del Toro

References
Catholic-Hierarchy entry.
GCatholic.org.

Panama
Roman Catholic dioceses in Panama